Namtit Subtownship (Wa: nām dēeg) is a subtownship of the Wa Self-Administered Division of Shan State, formerly and conterminously part of Hopang District. Its principal town is Namtit. It is de facto administrated as the Nam Deeg Special District of Wa State. 

Rubber finishing factories were constructed in Mongmao and in Pangsang and in Namtit as well.

References

Populated places in Shan State
Wa people
China–Myanmar border crossings